William E. Owen (November 28, 1888 - July 16, 1976) was a member of the Wisconsin State Senate and the Wisconsin State Assembly.

Biography
Owen was born on November 28, 1888 in New Haven, Dunn County, Wisconsin. Owen graduated from Connorsville, Wisconsin High School and went to the Dunn County Agriculture School. He was a farmer and was involved with the rural electric cooperative. Owen also served as president of the school board. Owen died on July 16, 1976 in Menomonie, Wisconsin.

Career
Owen was a member of the Senate from 1951 to 1954 and of the Assembly from 1957 to 1958. In 1954, he ran for the United States House of Representatives from Wisconsin's 9th congressional district, losing to Lester Johnson. He was a Republican.

References

People from Dunn County, Wisconsin
Businesspeople from Wisconsin
Farmers from Wisconsin
School board members in Wisconsin
Republican Party Wisconsin state senators
Republican Party members of the Wisconsin State Assembly
1888 births
1976 deaths
20th-century American politicians
20th-century American businesspeople